Off the Edge is a 1976 New Zealand documentary film directed by Michael Firth. It was nominated for an Academy Award for Best Documentary Feature. The film features backcountry skiing, extreme skiing and hang gliding in the Southern Alps. Despite being classed as a documentary, it does have some semblance of a fictionalised storyline.

References

External links

Off the Edge at NZ On Screen
Off the Edge (1977) at New Zealand Feature Film Database

1976 films
1976 documentary films
1976 independent films
1970s New Zealand films
1970s English-language films
Documentary films about sports
New Zealand documentary films
New Zealand independent films